Sun Zhigang (born 30 May 1954) is a Chinese politician who was the former Communist Party Secretary of Guizhou. He was formerly mayor of Yichang, the secretary-general of the Hubei party committee under Yu Zhengsheng, the Vice-Governor of Anhui province, and chief of the national office for health care reform.

Early life and career in academia
Sun Zhigang was born in May 1954 in Xingyang, Henan province. He joined the work force in February 1971 during the Cultural Revolution as a sent-down youth in Xingyang. In 1973, he entered Wuhan Institute of Metallurgy (now incorporated into Wuhan University of Science and Technology) as a "Worker-Peasant-Soldier student". He joined the Communist Party of China in September 1976. 

After graduating from college, Sun stayed at his alma mater as an instructor. He entered the Shanghai University of Finance and Economics to pursue graduate studies in economics, then he became, for a brief period, a research fellow at Zhongnan University of Economics and Law. In April 1985, he quit academia to pursue a career in politics, entering the Wuhan municipal government.

Political career
In Wuhan, the provincial capital, Sun became the deputy head of the city's economics commission, and also in charge of economic restructuring. He became the district deputy party chief, then governor of Hanyang District. In March 1993 he was named vice mayor of Wuhan, then transferred to serve as the mayor of Yichang in August 1996, and promoted to party chief in March 1999. He became a member of the provincial Party Standing Committee in June 2002, and the secretary-general of the Party Committee, becoming chief of staff under then-party chief Yu Zhengsheng.

Beginning in September 2006, Sun began serving as executive vice governor of Anhui province, and a member of the party ruling council there. After a comprehensive set of health care reforms were put into effect by the central government, Sun spearheaded implementation of the reforms in Anhui province, pioneering a government drug purchase program which was circulated at the national level and dubbed the "Anhui model." He was then tasked with implementing the Anhui model nationwide, taking on the role of deputy director of the National Development and Reform Commission in March 2010, and then in December 2010, the chief of the Office of Health Care Reform. In a government reshuffle in March 2013, Sun was named deputy director of the National Health and Family Planning Commission.

On 16 October 2015, Sun was appointed acting governor of Guizhou province, succeeding Chen Min'er, who had been promoted to provincial party chief. Sun's governorship was duly confirmed by the provincial People's Congress on 30 January 2016. 

In July 2017, Sun was appointed as the Communist Party Secretary of Guizhou.

In December 2020, Sun was appointed as the Deputy Chairperson of the National People's Congress Financial and Economic Affairs Committee.

References

1954 births
Living people
Chinese Communist Party politicians from Henan
People's Republic of China politicians from Henan
Governors of Guizhou
Political office-holders in Anhui
Political office-holders in Hubei
Mayors of places in China
Shanghai University of Finance and Economics alumni
Zhongnan University of Economics and Law alumni
Politicians from Zhengzhou
Wuhan University of Science and Technology alumni
Members of the 19th Central Committee of the Chinese Communist Party
Delegates to the 12th National People's Congress
Members of the 12th Chinese People's Political Consultative Conference